Elizabeth White House is a historic home in Sumter, Sumter County, South Carolina. It was built about 1854, and is a 1 1/2-story vernacular Greek Revival cottage. The front facade features a pedimented one-story portico supported by four square columns. It was the home of artist Elizabeth White (1883-1976). Under the provisions of White's will, the property was transferred to the Sumter Gallery of Art for use as an art gallery.

It was added to the National Register of Historic Places in 1978.

References

Houses on the National Register of Historic Places in South Carolina
Greek Revival houses in South Carolina
Houses completed in 1854
Houses in Sumter County, South Carolina
National Register of Historic Places in Sumter County, South Carolina